Peter Harvey Daley (born January 14, 1930) is a former catcher in Major League Baseball. From 1955 through 1961, Daley played for the Boston Red Sox (1955–59), Kansas City Athletics (1960) and Washington Senators (1961). He batted and threw right-handed.

In a seven-season career, Daley posted a .239 batting average with 18 home runs and 120 RBI in 391 games played. Daley was served as a backup for Sammy White with the Boston Red Sox. His most productive season came in 1956, when he compiled career-numbers in average (.267), home runs (five), RBI (29), runs (22), hits (50) and doubles (11). Before the 1960 season Daley was traded by Boston to the Kansas City Athletics in exchange for pitcher Tom Sturdivant. With the Athletics, he shared catching duties with Harry Chiti. Then, he was taken by the new Washington Senators in the 1960 MLB expansion draft, spending one season with them to end his major league career.

Anecdote
 August 22, 1957: Boston Red Sox at Cleveland Indians. Boston had one out in the top of the ninth inning, with Gene Mauch running at second base, Pete Daley at first, and Mike Fornieles at bat. Fornieles hit a sinking liner that Cleveland shortstop Chico Carrasquel speared in shallow center field. Carrasquel then threw to first to double-up Daley while Mauch continued around third and gone to home plate. The teams then switched positions. As soon as Boston pitcher Fornieles made his first pitch, umpire Hank Soar informed the scorer that Mauch's run counted because no appeal had been made on Mauch before Daley had been put out. Had the Indians also made an appeal on Mauch at second base, that "fourth out" would take precedence over the appeal on Daley, and the run scored by Mauch would have been prevented (Rule 7.10-d). Source: Rules and Lore of Baseball, by Rich Marazzi.

Sources
 Baseball Library
 Baseball Reference
 The Rules and Lore of Baseball

1930 births
Living people
Baseball players from California
Boston Red Sox players
Kansas City Athletics players
Louisville Colonels (minor league) players
Major League Baseball catchers
People from Grass Valley, California
Raleigh Capitals players
Roanoke Red Sox players
San Jose Red Sox players
Scranton Miners players
Toronto Maple Leafs (International League) players
Washington Senators (1961–1971) players